Badger Mountain Ski Area is a small ski area, 4 miles SW of Waterville, Washington. It is located on the northeastern flank of Badger Mountain. Established in 1939, it is currently a volunteer-run ski area sponsored by the local Waterville Lions Club. The ski area has one small lodge, which has a small selection of rentals, and a kitchen.

References

External links
 Badger Mountain Ski Area Website

Buildings and structures in Douglas County, Washington
Ski areas and resorts in Washington (state)
Tourist attractions in Douglas County, Washington